Protector was a barque built and launched in 1827 in Canada. She is mostly known for transporting colonists to the nascent Swan River Colony in February 1830. She was last mentioned in 1834.

Career
She was built in Lincoln, New Brunswick, Canada as a three-masted barque with square stern, no galleries, and a bust figurehead. She was launched by John Richard Portelow on 19 May 1827, and on 3 November the following year was sold to a consortium of merchants in Bristol (England) — Edward Bevan (21 shares); William Cross (22 shares); and Francis Holladay (21 shares also). They appointed George Thomas as Master for her first voyage.

In 1829 she was re-registered with an altered construction comprising square rig, sham quarter galleries, and a female figurehead. Her first voyage proper was to the Swan River Colony, departing Gravesend on 11 October 1829. She arrived in Western Australia on 25 February 1830. Amongst her passengers were Henry Ernest and Sarah Theodosia Hall, and their son William Shakespeare Hall.

The return voyage to England was via Mauritius and Calcutta.

Other ships that arrived in 1830 included: Calista, St. Leonard,  (wrecked), Thomson, Georgia, Lotus, Tranby, Warrior,  Britannia, Atwick, Governor Phillip, Euphemia, Aurelia, Orelia, Caroline, Lion, Dragon, Nancy, Leda, and Skerne.

Protector, late Mathias, arrived at Liverpool on 1 May 1833. She had come from Savannah in 25 days.

On 9 July, Protector, Lewis, master, having come from New Orleans, grounded in Prince's Basin, Liverpool, as she was setting out for Savannah, but was gotten off and brought into dock.<ref>"Shipping Intelligence". New-York Spectator (New York, New York), 29 July 1833.</ref>

FateProtector'', Lewis, master, arrived at Liverpool from New Orleans on 9 January 1834. Her registry was closed at Londonderry on 15 April.

Citations and references 
Citations

References

Age of Sail merchant ships
Barques
1827 ships
Ships built in Canada
Migrant ships to Australia